Events from the year 1830 in art.

Events
David Wilkie appointed Principal Painter in Ordinary to King William IV of the United Kingdom following the death of Sir Thomas Lawrence.
Clarkson Stanfield's panorama The Military Pass of the Simplon is featured in a Christmas pantomime in London.
Approximate beginning of the Barbizon school of painters.

Publications
Edward Lear – Illustrations of the Family of Psittacidae, or Parrots (first in a series of lithographs.

Works

George Catlin – General William Clark
Jean-Baptiste-Camille Corot – Chartres Cathedral
Eugène Delacroix – Liberty Leading the People
William Etty — Candaules, King of Lydia, Shews his Wife by Stealth to Gyges, One of his Ministers, as She Goes to Bed
Sarah Goodridge – Self-portrait
Francesco Hayez – Venus Playing with Two Doves (Portrait of the Ballerina Carlotta Chabert)
Carl Friedrich Lessing - A King and Queen in Mourning
Georges Michel – L'Orage (approximate date)
Luigi Mussini – Death of Atala
Samuel Palmer – Coming from Evening Church
William Strickland – Nathanael Greene Monument

Awards
 Grand Prix de Rome, painting:
 Grand Prix de Rome, sculpture:
 Grand Prix de Rome, architecture:
 Grand Prix de Rome, music: Hector Berlioz & Alexandre Montfort ("second" First Grand Prize).

Births
January 7 – Albert Bierstadt, landscape painter (died 1902)
January 17 - Blaise Alexandre Desgoffe, French still-life painter (died 1901)
April 9 – Eadweard Muybridge – photographer (died 1904)
June 29 – John Quincy Adams Ward, sculptor (died 1910)
July 9 – Henry Peach Robinson, photographer (died 1901)
July 10 – Camille Pissarro, impressionist painter (died 1903)
August 6 – Francis Bicknell Carpenter, American painter (died 1900)
August 12 – John O'Connor, painter (died 1889)
August 29 – John William Inchbold, pre-Raphaelite painter (died 1888)
October 24 – Marianne North, English naturalist and flower painter (died 1890)
December 3 – Frederic Leighton, 1st Baron Leighton, painter and sculptor (died 1896)
date unknown – Nikolai Nevrev, Russian painter (died 1904)

Deaths
January 7 – Sir Thomas Lawrence – English portrait painter (born 1769)
February 11 – Johann Baptist von Lampi the Elder, Austrian historical and portrait painter (born 1751)
February 14 – Jean-Baptiste Giraud, French sculptor (born 1752)
February 16 – Edme Quenedey des Ricets, French miniature painter and engraver (born 1756)
February 23 – Jan Piotr Norblin, French-born Polish painter and engraver  (born 1740)
February 28 – Gaspare Landi, Italian Neoclassical painter  (born 1756)
April 10 – Johann Jakob Biedermann, Swiss  painter and etcher (born 1763)
May 11 – János Donát, Hungarian painter (born 1744)
 August – William Payne, English painter, inventor of Payne's grey (born 1760)
August 22 – Jakob Wilhelm Roux, German draughtsman and painter (born 1771)
September 15 – François Baillairgé, Canadian artist of woodworking, wood-carving, and architecture (born 1759)
September 21 – Louis-Marie Autissier, French-born Belgian portrait miniature painter (born 1772)
November 8 – Sylvester Shchedrin, Russian landscape painter (born 1791)
November 17 – Petrus Johannes van Regemorter, Flemish landscape and genre painter (born 1755)
December 7 – Joseph Stannard, English painter of the Norwich school  (born 1797)
December 15 – Moritz Kellerhoven, Austrian painter (born 1758)
 date unknown 
 Pavel Đurković, Serbian painter and muralist (born 1772).
 Agustín Esteve, Spanish portraitist and royal court painter (born 1753)

References

 
Years of the 19th century in art
1830s in art